Mikko Tarmia is a Finnish video game music composer known for working with Codeblender Software, Frictional Games, and Wolfire Games. He founded the independent record label The Sound of Fiction.

His first work was with the Macintosh developer Codeblender Software, and between 2002 and 2005 worked on four games with them. He is most well known for making the music for the Penumbra series. His record label released the soundtrack for the games in January 2010. He also worked with Frictional Games for their game Amnesia: The Dark Descent, with a feature about him being included with the games special features.

He has worked on Frictional Games' SOMA and with Wolfire Games for their game Overgrowth.

Games credited 
 Amnesia: Rebirth
 SOMA
 Overgrowth
 Amnesia: The Dark Descent
 Penumbra: Necrologue
 Penumbra: Requiem
 Penumbra: Black Plague
 Penumbra: Overture
 Deep Trouble 2
 Rally Shift
 Epsilon Tahari: Reign of the Machines
 DeepTrouble
 The Designer's Curse

References

External links
Personal Website
The Sound of Fiction
Making of Amnesia – Composer Mikko Tarmia

1978 births
Finnish composers
Finnish male composers
Living people
Male composers
Video game composers